Pearl Sharlin Etienne (born 7 June 1982) is a Dominican cricketer who currently plays for Windward Islands as a right-arm medium bowler. Between 2010 and 2012, she appeared in 8 One Day Internationals and 13 Twenty20 Internationals for the West Indies. She previously played domestic cricket for Dominica.

References

External links

1982 births
Living people
People from Saint George Parish, Dominica
Dominica women cricketers
West Indian women cricketers
West Indies women One Day International cricketers
West Indies women Twenty20 International cricketers
Windward Islands women cricketers